Acacia sedifolia is a shrub of the genus Acacia and the subgenus Phyllodineae that is endemic to south western Australia.

Description
The resinous, glabrous branchlets are aromatic when crushed. The thick green nerveless phyllodes are crowded on the branchlets and have an oblong to asymmetrically cuneate shape that is recurved at least at the apex. It blooms from June to August and produces yellow flowers.

Taxonomy
It was first formally described by the botanists Joseph Maiden and William Blakely in 1928 as part of the work Descriptions of fifty new species and six varieties of western and northern Australian Acacias, and notes on four other species as published in the Journal of the Royal Society of Western Australia. It was reclassified as Racosperma sedifolium in 2003 by Leslie Pedley then transferred back to genus Acacia in 2006.
There are two recognised subspecies:
 Acacia sedifolia subsp. pulvinata
 Acacia sedifolia subsp. sedifolia

Distribution
It is native to an area in the Wheatbelt region of Western Australia where it is found on ridges and hill tops in areas of laterite growing in gravelly sand, clay or loam soils.

See also
List of Acacia species

References

sedifolia
Acacias of Western Australia
Plants described in 1928
Taxa named by Joseph Maiden
Taxa named by William Blakely